Elections to South Cambridgeshire District Council took place on Thursday 22 May 2014, as part of the 2014 United Kingdom local elections. The election was held at the same time as elections to the European Parliament. Nineteen seats, making up one third of South Cambridgeshire District Council, were up for election. Seats up for election in 2014 were last contested at the 2010 election.

Summary
The list of candidates was published on 24 April 2014. The Liberal Democrats and the Labour Party stood candidates in all 19 wards up for election this year. The Conservative Party stood in 17 wards. The United Kingdom Independence Party had seven candidates, while the Green Party stood five candidates. There were six independent candidates.

Results

Results by ward

References

2014
2014 English local elections
2010s in Cambridgeshire